Melanocinclis sparsa is a moth in the family Cosmopterigidae. It is found in North America, where it has been recorded from Alabama, Arkansas, Mississippi, South Carolina and Tennessee.

The wingspan is about 7 mm. Adults have been recorded from May to June and in August.

References

Natural History Museum Lepidoptera generic names catalog

Cosmopteriginae